Bellapiscis is a genus of triplefins in the family Tripterygiidae.

Species
 Mottled twister, Bellapiscis lesleyae Hardy, 1987.
 Twister, Bellapiscis medius (Günther, 1861).

References
 

 
Tripterygiidae